The Thousand Faces of Dunjia is a 2017 Chinese fantasy-wuxia film directed by Yuen Woo-ping; scripted and produced by Tsui Hark. It is a remake of Yuen's 1982 film The Miracle Fighters. The film stars Da Peng, Aarif Lee, Ni Ni, Wu Bai, and Zhou Dongyu. It was released in China on December 15, 2017.

Plot
The film follows a group of swordsmen's adventures to secretly protect humankind by hunting some mysterious creatures from the outer space.

Cast
Da Peng as Zhuge Qingyun
Ni Ni as Metal Dragonfly
Aarif Lee as Dao Yichang
Zhou Dongyu as Xiao Yuan
Wu Bai as Boss
Ada Liu
Tiger Xu 
Yang Yiwei
Mo Tse
Sun Mingming
Zhang Yiqian

Awards and nominations

References

External links

Chinese fantasy adventure films
Wuxia films
2017 films
2010s Mandarin-language films
Films directed by Yuen Woo-ping